Sergey Chukanov (born 29 April 1988) is a former Ukrainian racing driver. In 2013, he won the Ferrari Challenge Europe Trofeo Pirelli.

Career
Chukanov competed in kart racing before graduating to single seaters in 2006 when he entered Formula Renault NEC with Lukoil Racing. In his first season, he scored 96 points and finished 15th in the championship. For 2007, he moved to Formula 1600 Russia, and then for 2008 & 2009 he moved to ATS Formel 3 Cup. In his second season he won the trophy drivers championship series for Stromos Art-Line, winning 14 of the 18 races.

After a career break, Chukanov returned to racing in 2013 in the Superstars GT series. Driving a Ferrari 458 he won 1 of the 2 sprint races entered for Team Ukraine. The same year he would drive in the Ferrari Challenge Europe, a series he would win for Ferrari Ukraina. Over the season he won 3 races and secured a further 3 podium finishes. In 2014, he drove one race in the European Le Mans Series at Silverstone, winning the GTC category. In 2015, he completed two races in the Blancpain GT and Endurance series but failed to finish either race.

Racing Record

Career Summary

References

External links
 Sergey Chukanov official website
 Sergey Chukanov profile on driverDB

1988 births
Living people
Ukrainian racing drivers
Formula Renault 2.0 NEC drivers
German Formula Three Championship drivers
Superstars Series drivers
European Le Mans Series drivers
Blancpain Endurance Series drivers
People from Kamianske